Yanbu Commercial Port is among the ancient ports on the Red Sea. Its strategic importance comes from the fact that the port is a main gateway to the Muslim holy city of Medinah. It is a natural port surrounded by land and coral reef. The port, like many other Saudi ports, has undergone many development projects since the establishment of Saudi Arabia. Currently, the port sector, including Yanbu Commercial Port, is led by the Saudi Ports Authority. Yanbu Commercial Port’s operations grow faster as in 2018 only the port operated 3.33 million tons of cargo. Moreover, the port has a special 7,200 square meters terminal to receive pilgrims.

See also 
 King Fahad Industrial Port (Yanbu)
 Saudi Ports Authority
 Yanbu

References 

Ports and harbours of the Red Sea
Ports and harbours of Saudi Arabia